Cut flowers are flowers or flower buds (often with some stem and leaf) that have been cut from the plant bearing it. It is usually removed from the plant for decorative use. Typical uses are in vase displays, wreaths, and garlands. Many home gardeners harvest flowers from their own gardens, but there is a significant international floral industry for cut flowers. The plants cropped vary by climate, culture and the level of wealth locally. Often the plants are raised specifically for the purpose, in field or glasshouse growing conditions. Cut flowers can also be harvested from the wild.

The cultivation and trade of flowers is a specialization in horticulture, specifically floriculture.

Cultivation
Cut flower cultivation is intensive, usually on the basis of greenhouse monocultures, and requires large amounts of highly toxic pesticides, residues of which can often still be found in flower shops on imported flowers.

These facts have spurred the development of movements like "Slow Flowers", which propagates sustainable floriculture in the consumer country (U.S., Canada) itself.

Uses
A common use is for floristry, usually for decoration inside a house or building. Typically the cut flowers are placed in a vase. A number of similar types of decorations are used, especially in larger buildings and at events such as weddings. These are often decorated with additional foliage.
In some cultures, a major use of cut flowers is for worship; this can be seen especially in south and southeast Asia.

Sometimes the flowers are picked rather than cut, without any significant leaf or stem. Such flowers may be used for wearing in hair, or in a button-hole. Masses of flowers may be used for sprinkling, in a similar way to confetti.

Garlands, wreaths and bouquets are major derived and value added products.

Popular taxa
Among the most popular species and genera in the worldwide cut flower trade are the following:

Alstroemeria
Asters
Banksias
Begonias
Bellflowers (Campanula)
Bird of Paradise (Strelitzia reginae)
Bulb flowers, mostly available in spring
Daffodils
Freesia
Tulips
Busy lizzies
Carnations (Dianthus caryophyllus)
Chinese lantern (Alkekengi)
Chrysanthemum
Clematis
Cyclamens
Daisies
Delphiniums
Epacris impressa
Fuchsias
Gardenias
Geraniums
Gerberas
Gladiolus
Gumamelas
Gypsophilas
Heathers (Calluna vulgaris)
Hydrangeas
Iris
Lavender (Lavendula)
Leucadendron
Lilacs
Lilies (Lilium)
Stargazer Lily
Lobelias
Love Lies Bleeding (Amaranthus caudatus)
Love-in-a-Mist (Nigella)
Oleander
Orchids
Cooktown Orchid
Pansies
Pelargoniums
Petunias
Plumeria
Poinsettias
Primroses (Primulaceae)
Protea
Red and Green Kangaroo Paw
Roses (Rosa)
Royal Bluebell
Sampaguita
Snapdragons
Statices
Sturt's Desert Rose
Sunflowers (Helianthus annuus)
Tasmanian Blue Gum
Verbenas
Waratah
White trillium
Ylang Ylang

Not mentioned are various wildflowers, depending on season and country.

Longevity

Once flowers are removed from the plant they continue to grow slowly, but have a diminished capability of receiving the nutrients that are vital for their survival. In most countries, cut flowers are a local crop because of their perishable nature. In India, much of the product has a shelf life of only a day. Among these are marigold flowers for garlands and temples, which are typically harvested before dawn, and discarded after use the same day.

The majority of cut flowers can be expected to last several days with proper care. This generally requires standing them in water in shade. They can be treated in various ways to increase their life. Putting cut flowers in a sterilized vase can extend the life of the flowers. Vases can be cleaned using a household dish detergent or a combination of water and bleach. Using these disinfectants ensures that there will be less bacteria growing within the vase that could potentially cause the plant to wilt and die. Cutting the flowers diagonally with a sharp knife under running water ensures that they can immediately take up fresh and clean water. Re-cutting the stems periodically will ensure that there is a fresh surface from which the stems can take up water. This may allow the flowers to last. Other ways to care for vase flowers includes keeping flowers away from ceiling fans and air-conditioning vents as this can lead to dehydration, keeping flowers away from fresh fruit of vegetables, using filtered water rather than tap water so as to avoid both chlorine and fluoride, and keeping flowers away from your television.

There is also a market for 'everlasting' or dried flowers, which include species such as Xerochrysum bracteatum. These can have a very long shelf life.

Additives

The Brooklyn Botanical Garden tested different items that have been claimed to prolong the lives of cut flowers when added to the vase water. These were aspirin, sugar, vitamin pills, vinegar, pennies, and flower food. They found that the best additive for flowers was the retailer-provided "flower food" that is usually given with a bouquet. Flower foods contain an acidifier that adjusts the water's pH, preservatives, stem unpluggers, and sugar. The sugar replaces the sugar from its roots. The stem unpluggers allow the flower to continue to take up fluids. Sugar alone is almost as effective.

Trade

The largest producers are, in order of cultivated area, China, India, and the United States. The largest importer and exporter by value is the Netherlands, which is both a grower and a redistributor of crops imported from other countries. Most of its exports go to its European neighbours.

In recent decades, with the increasing use of air freight, it has become economic for high value crops to be grown far from their point of sale; the market is usually in industrialised countries. Typical of these is the production of roses in Ecuador and Colombia, mainly for the US market, and production in Kenya and Uganda for the European market. Some countries specialise in especially high value products, such as orchids from Singapore and Thailand.

As with the production of fruit and vegetables, the industry depends on significant amounts of water, which may be collected and stored by the farm owners. The Patel Dam failure in May 2018, associated with a large Kenyan rose farm, killed dozens of people.

The total market value in most countries is considerable. It has been estimated at GBP 2 billion in the United Kingdom, of the same order as that of music sales.

Further reading
Arbeláez, María Angélica, Marcela Meléndez, and Nicolás León "The Emergence of Fresh Cut-Flower Exports in Colombia" In Export Pioneers in Latin America Edited by Charles Sabel et al., Baltimore: Inter-American Development Bank 2012.  
Austin, James E. 1990. Cut Flower Industry in Colombia (Abridged). Boston: Harvard Business School.
Encinales, Felipe, and James E. Austin. 1990. "The Cut Flower Industry in Colombia". In James E. Austin with Tomás O. Kohn, Strategic Management in Developing Countries: Case Studies. New York: The Free Press 1990.
Goody, Jack. The culture of flowers. Cambridge University Press,

See also
Floral industry
Slow Flowers
Ornamental plant
Flower arrangement
History of flower arrangement
Dutch flower bucket

References

External links
Cut-Flower Care — How to Make Your Fresh-Cut Flowers Last by Rose G. Edinger, Brooklyn Botanical Garden, Spring 2003, retrieved October 21, 2006
— What are preserved flowers? Everything you want to know about preserved flowers by Floralonly, Albert, published 28, May 2020
Traditions of flower gifting in different cultures and countries

Floriculture
Floristry
Floral industry